Acacia microbotrya, commonly known as manna wattle or gum wattle, is a shrub or tree belonging to the genus Acacia and the subgenus Phyllodineae that is native to Western Australia.

The Noongar peoples know the tree as Badjong, Galyang, Koonert or Menna.

Description
It has glabrous branchlets with rough brown bark on the stem. The patent to pendulous grey-green phyllodes have a narrowly elliptic to oblanceolate shape. It blooms from March to August and produces yellow-cream flowers.

Taxonomy
The species was first formally described by the botanist George Bentham in 1842 as part of William Jackson Hooker's work Notes on Mimoseae, with a synopsis of species as published in the London Journal of Botany. It was reclassified as Racosperma microbotryum in 2003 by Leslie Pedley then transferred back to the genus Acacia in 2014.

A. microbotrya is very closely related to Acacia amblyophylla and Acacia jennerae but strongly resembles Acacia galeata and Acacia saligna.

There are two recognised variations:Acacia microbotrya var. borealisAcacia microbotrya var. microbotrya''

Distribution
It is native to an area in the Wheatbelt, Great Southern and Goldfields-Esperance regions of Western Australia where it grows among rocky outcrops, near watercourses, around salt lakes and along road verges in clay loam or sandy loam soils often over granite. The bulk of the population is from Kalbarri south east to around Katanning with scattered populations further east near Ongerup and Lake King.

Cultivation
The plant is commercially available in seed form or as tubestock. It is commonly used in native gardens as in land rehabilitation an ornamental, as a windbreak, for shelter and for sandalwood. It is fast growing is salt tolerant and will survive in waterlogged areas.

See also
List of Acacia species

References

microbotrya
Acacias of Western Australia
Plants described in 1842
Taxa named by George Bentham